John F. Hartwig is an American organometallic chemist who holds the position of Henry Rapoport Professor of Chemistry at the University of California, Berkeley. His laboratory traditionally focuses on developing transition metal-catalyzed reactions. Hartwig is known for helping develop the Buchwald–Hartwig amination, a chemical reaction used in organic chemistry for the synthesis of carbon–nitrogen bonds via the palladium-catalyzed cross-coupling of amines with aryl halides.

Education and training
Hartwig received his A.B. from Princeton University in 1986.  With Robert G. Bergman and Richard A. Andersen as coadvisors, he earned his Ph.D. from the University of California, Berkeley in 1990.  Thereafter he was an American Cancer Society Postdoctoral Associate at MIT, where he worked in the laboratory of Stephen J. Lippard.

Research
He assumed an independent position at Yale University in 1992.  Over the next 14 years, he was promoted to associate professor, full professor and finally the Irénée duPont professorship. During this period, the Buchwald–Hartwig amination was developed. Here is an example of this reaction (OTf = triflate or trifluoromethanesulfonate):

Also while at Yale, he discovered the metal-catalyzed borylation of unactivated C-H bonds. 

 

In 2006, he assumed the Kenneth L. Reinhart Jr. professorship at the University of Illinois at Urbana–Champaign.  There he published "Organotransition Metal Chemistry: From Bonding to Catalysis."  In 2011 he returned to Berkeley as Henry Rapoport Professor of Chemistry as well as a member of the Lawrence Berkeley National Laboratory.  He was elected to the National Academy of Sciences in 2012.  In 2019, together with Stephen Buchwald, he was awarded the Wolf Prize.

Memberships, fellowships, and awards

References

UC Berkeley College of Chemistry faculty
21st-century American chemists
Princeton University alumni
1964 births
Living people
Monsanto employees
Organic chemists